Arms of state may mean

 The national coat of arms of a state
 The branches of government, see separation of powers